The Chivay obsidian source (15.6423° S, 71.5355° W, 4972 masl) is the geological origin of a chemical group of obsidian that is found throughout the south-central Andean highlands including southern Peru and western Bolivia. Chemical characterization studies using X-ray fluorescence (XRF) and Neutron Activation Analysis (NAA) have shown that the Chivay obsidian source, also known as the Cotallalli type or the Titicaca Basin type, makes up over 90% of the obsidian artifacts analyzed from the Lake Titicaca Basin.

Obsidian from the Chivay source is found in large and homogeneous nodules in a high altitude volcanic depression approximately ten km to the east of the town of Chivay in the Colca Valley (Caylloma, Arequipa, Peru).

Consumption sites 

Obsidian from the Chivay source has been chemically identified among artifacts from over fifty sites in the south-central Andes.  Chivay obsidian was the predominant type found at the Archaic and Formative site of Jiskairumoko on the western side of Lake Titicaca in the Ilave Valley of Puno, Peru.

References

Quarries in South America
Stone (material)
Archaeology of Bolivia
Geology of Bolivia
Archaeology of Chile
Geology of Chile
Archaeology of Peru
Geology of Peru
Obsidian